Bruno Pereira de Albuquerque (born 20 July 1994), commonly known as Bruno Paraíba, is a Brazilian footballer who currently plays as a forward for Brazilian side Figueirense.

Career statistics

Club

Notes

References

1994 births
Living people
Sportspeople from Paraíba
Brazilian footballers
Association football forwards
Centro Sportivo Paraibano players
Nacional Atlético Clube (Patos) players
Oeste Futebol Clube players
Associação Desportiva Confiança players
Grêmio Esportivo Brasil players
Figueirense FC players
Ventforet Kofu players
Brazilian expatriate footballers
Brazilian expatriate sportspeople in Japan
Expatriate footballers in Japan